20 Boötis is a single star in the northern constellation of Boötes, located 183 light years away from the Sun. It is visible to the naked eye as a faint, orange-hued star with an apparent visual magnitude of 4.84. The star has a relatively high proper motion, traversing the celestial sphere at the rate of 0.154 arc seconds per annum. It is moving closer to the Earth with a heliocentric radial velocity of −8 km/s.

This is an aging K-type giant star with a stellar classification of K3 III. It is a red clump giant, which indicates it is on the horizontal branch and is generating energy through helium fusion at its core. The star is around five billion years old with 1.1 times the mass of the Sun and has expanded to 12 times the Sun's radius. It is radiating 52 times the luminosity of the Sun from its swollen photosphere at an effective temperature of 4,472 K.

References

External links
 HR 5370
 Image 20 Boötis

K-type giants
Horizontal-branch stars
Boötes
Durchmusterung objects
Bootis, 20
125560
070027
5370
Suspected variables